The Ambassador of the United Kingdom to Kazakhstan is the United Kingdom's foremost diplomatic representative in the Republic of Kazakhstan, and head of the UK's diplomatic mission in Nur-Sultan.  The official title is His Britannic Majesty's Ambassador to the Republic of Kazakhstan.

Until 2012 the ambassador to Kazakhstan served concurrently as the non-resident Ambassador to Kyrgyzstan, an ambassadorial position in its own right.

Ambassadors
1993–1995: Noel Jones
1995–1999: Douglas McAdam
1999–2002: Richard Lewington
2002–2005: James Sharp
2005–2009: Paul Brummell
2009–2012: David Moran
2013–2018: Carolyn Browne

2018–: Michael Gifford

References

External links
Kazakhstan and the UK, gov.uk

Kazakhstan
 
United Kingdom